Abak/Midim is one of the nine Clans or Districts in Oruk Anam local government area of Akwa Ibom State. It is one of the two Clans or Districts in the former Anam Local Government Area, both in southern Nigeria.

History 

Abak/Midim is bordered by Ibesit/Nung Ikot Clan of Oruk Anam in the north, Edemaya Clan of Ikot Abasi in the south, Ikpa Nung Asang (Essene) Clan of Ikot Abasi in the east, and the Imoh River in the west, which separates Akwa Ibom State from the Ogoni Nation of Rivers State. It is the gateway between Rivers State capital, Port Harcourt, and Akwa Ibom State, through the Nigeria's East-West road. 

The area has about one quarter of Oruk Anam's 172,000 people. The area is rich in arable farmland, which makes farming as the occupation of about half of the populace. Others are involved in petty trading, artisanship, and civil service. The area is also rich in crude oil, with several oil wells located in Ikot Inuen, Ikot Otu, Eka Ediene, Ikot Otok and Ute Etok.

The area has public Secondary Schools.

Subdivision 
The 37 Communities:

References 

Towns in Oruk Anam